WVSE (91.9 FM) is a radio station broadcasting a Spanish variety format. Licensed to Christiansted, U.S. Virgin Islands, the station is currently owned by Jose J. Martinez Velilla, under licensee Crucian Educational Non-Profit Group.

External links

VSE
Radio stations established in 2011
2011 establishments in the United States Virgin Islands
Spanish-language radio stations in the United States
Variety radio stations in insular areas of the United States